James Berkeley, 1st Baron Berkeley (c. 1394 – 22 October 1463), also known as "James the Just", was an English peer.

Berkeley was the son of Sir James de Berkeley and his wife Elizabeth (née Bluet). He was made heir to his uncle Thomas de Berkeley, 5th Baron Berkeley. He was married four times. His third wife was Lady Isabel, daughter of Thomas Mowbray, 1st Duke of Norfolk; and his fourth wife was the Lady Joan Talbot, daughter of John Talbot, 1st Earl of Shrewsbury. Lord Berkeley was involved in a bitter feud with his cousin Elizabeth, daughter of the fifth Baron Berkeley and wife of Richard de Beauchamp, 13th Earl of Warwick. He was unable initially to claim Berkeley Castle, as it was taken in possession by the Earl and Countess of Warwick. In 1421, when the Warwicks finally gave up Berkeley Castle, James was summoned to Parliament by writ as Lord Berkeley. The feud did not end there as his third wife Isabel was captured by the Countess of Warwick's son-in-law the Earl of Shrewsbury, and held imprisoned until her death in 1452.

Lord Berkeley was succeeded by his son from his third marriage, William, who was created Marquess of Berkeley in 1489.

Marriages and issue
He firstly married the daughter of John St. John on 9 April 1410, by contract, and had no issue.

His second marriage was to the daughter of Sir Humphrey Stafford of Hook Dorset in 1415. No issue came from this marriage.

In about 1424, he was wed to Lady Isabel de Mowbray (b. 1396 - d. 29 November 1452), in which James was her second husband and Henry Ferrers was her first. They had the following issue:

Elizabeth de Berkeley (b. 1425 - d. 1482)
Sir William de Berkeley, Earl of Nottingham (c. 1427 - 1492); William became the 2nd Baron Berkeley sometime after his father's death in 1463.
James de Berkeley, Esquire (b. 1429)
Alice de Berkeley (b. 1432)
Sir Maurice de Berkeley VI, Lord Berkeley (c. 1435 - 1 September 1506), who was married to Isabel Meade, daughter of merchant Phillip Meade and his wife Isabel, in 1465 and had issue.
Thomas de Berkeley, Esquire (b. 1435 - d. 1484), who married Margaret Guy, and had issue. 
Isabel de Berkeley (b. 1438 - d. 1482)

His fourth marriage to Joan Talbot was before 25 July 1457.

Notes

References
Kidd, Charles, Williamson, David (editors). Debrett's Peerage and Baronetage (1990 edition). New York: St Martin's Press, 1990.

1390s births
1463 deaths
1
James
Peers created by Henry V